Jean Marie M'ba was the foreign minister of Gabon for a period in 1967.

References

Possibly living people
Foreign ministers of Gabon
Year of birth missing